The  is a high-speed Shinkansen train service operated by East Japan Railway Company (JR East) on the Joetsu Shinkansen in Japan.

The name is taken from the Japanese name of the crested ibis, for which Niigata is famous.

Station Stops
 
 *
 
 *
 *
 *
 *
 *
 *
 *
 *
 

(*) Not served by all trains

Rolling stock
 E7 series 12-car sets (Toki) (from 3 March 2019)

Former rolling stock
 E1 series 12-car sets (Max Toki) (until 28 September 2012)
 200 series 10-car sets "K" sets (until 15 March 2013)
 E2 series 10-car sets (from 26 January 2013)
 E4 series 8-car sets (Max Toki) (until 1 October 2021)

History

Limited express

The name Toki was first introduced on 10 June 1962 for limited express services operating between Ueno in Tokyo and Niigata on the Joetsu Line. This service operated until 14 November 1982, the day before the Joetsu Shinkansen opened.

Shinkansen

The Toki name was discontinued from October 1997 following the introduction of new Tanigawa all-stations services between Tokyo and Echigo-Yuzawa. However, the name was reinstated from December 2002 to replace the name Asahi used for all Tokyo to Niigata trains.

The E4 series sets were retired at the beginning of October 2021, marking the end of bi-level high-speed trains operating on Shinkansen services.

Special train services
A special  service ran as Toki 395 from Omiya to Niigata on 17 November 2012 using 10-car 200 series set K47.

See also
 List of named passenger trains of Japan

References

External links

 200 series Yamabiko/Toki/Nasuno/Tanigawa 
  
 E4 series Max Toki/Max Tanigawa 

Jōetsu Shinkansen
Railway services introduced in 1962
Named Shinkansen trains